Parksville is an unincorporated community in Polk County, Tennessee, United States.

Landrum Bolling (1913-2018), American educator and diplomat, was born in Parksville.

Notes

Unincorporated communities in Polk County, Tennessee
Unincorporated communities in Tennessee